Oenopota excurvata is a species of sea snail, a marine gastropod mollusk in the family Mangeliidae.

Description
The length of the shell attains 10 mm, its diameter 3.8 mm. The characteristics are similar to Curtitoma trevelliana (Turton, 1834) except for the white color, being shorter and the margins of the whorls being more curved.

Distribution
This species occurs from the Bering Sea to the Salish Sea, Northwest America

References

 Philip Carpenter, Diagnoses Specierum et Varietatum novarum Moluscorum prope sinum Pugetianum; Proceedings of the Academy of Natural Sciences of Philadelphia vol. 17 (1865)
 Carpenter P. (1872) The Mollusks of Western North America, Smithsonian Institution, Washington

External links
 
 

excurvata
Gastropods described in 1864
Taxa named by Philip Pearsall Carpenter